The 2007 European Championship of Ski Mountaineering was the seventh European Championship of ski mountaineering and was held in Avoriaz, Morzine between the Mont Blanc and the Lac Léman from March 24 - 28.

The competition was organized by the Fédération française de la montagne et de l’escalade (FFME) ordered by the International Council for Ski Mountaineering Competitions (ISMC) of the Union Internationale des Associations d'Alpinisme (UIAA). About 230 athletes of 21 nations participated. Compared to the 2005 European Championship the vertical race and the relay race event also ranked.

Results

Nation ranking and medals 
(all age groups)

Vertical race 
Event held in Morzine on March 24, 2007

List of the best 10 participants by gender:

Team 
Event held in Morzine on March 25, 2007

List of the best 10 teams by gender:

Relay 
Event held in Morzine on March 26, 2007.

List of the best 10 teams by gender:

Individual 
Event held on March 28, 2007

List of the best 10 participants by gender:

Combination ranking 
combined ranking (results of the individual races and team races events)

List of the best 10 participants by gender:

References

External links 
 EM 2007 at mountains2b.com

2007
European Championship Of Ski Mountaineering, 2007
International sports competitions hosted by France
European Championship Of Ski Mountaineering, 2007
European Championship Of Ski Mountaineering
Skiing competitions in France